James G. Quintiere is an American mechanical engineer known for his work on fire protection engineering and fire safety. He is professor emeritus in the Department of Fire Protection Engineering at the University of Maryland's A. James Clark School of Engineering. A noted expert on arson, he has testified in criminal trials regarding the causes of certain fires, such as the one that occurred in the Waco siege and killed over 80 people. He has also studied the causes of the collapse of the World Trade Center, concluding that it was probably caused by faulty fireproofing.

Career
Quintiere's career in fire safety began in 1971, when he joined the National Institute of Science and Technology (NIST). He left the NIST in 1989, where he was the Chief of the Fire Science and Engineering Division, to become a professor at the University of Maryland. He was named the John L. Bryan Chair in Fire Protection Engineering at the University of Maryland in 1999.

Society affiliations and awards
Quintiere is a fellow of the Society of Fire Protection Engineers (SFPE) and the American Society of Mechanical Engineers. In 1998, he received the Harry C. Bigglestone Award from the National Fire Protection Association. In 2006, he received the SFPE's Arthur B. Guise Medal.

References

External links
Faculty page

Living people
American mechanical engineers
University of Maryland, College Park faculty
New Jersey Institute of Technology alumni
New York University alumni
Fellows of the American Society of Mechanical Engineers
Year of birth missing (living people)
20th-century American engineers
21st-century American engineers